Brickellia oligadena is a Mexican species of flowering plants in the family Asteraceae. It is native to western Mexico, the states of Michoacán, Colima, Guerrero, and Jalisco.

Brickellia oligadena is a shrub sometimes growing up to 3 meters (10 feet) tall.

References

External links
SEINet, Southwestern Biodiversity, Arizona Chapter,  Brickellia squarrosa var. oligadena B.L.Rob.  includes distribution map and photo of herbarium specimen

oligadena
Flora of Mexico
Plants described in 1917